Brent McMahon (born January 3, 1966) is a former paralympic athlete from Canada.

In 1986 McMahon injured his spine in an automobile accident—and quickly resumed his athletic pursuits. From 1986 to 1995 McMahon played for provincial, national, and state (US) wheelchair rugby teams, leading the Atlanta Rolling Thunder to two National Championships appearances.

McMahon has competed in two Paralympics. He placed first (1996) and fifth (2000) in the marathon, sixth (1996) and eleventh (2000) in the 5000m, and seventh (2000) in the 1500m.
Atlanta 1996 5000M Marathon — Gold Medal
Sydney 2000 1500 M 5000 M Marathon

Personal life
McMahon lives in Pawleys Island, SC. He was educated at Carleton University and is the co-founder of Screen 5ive media. He is married to Ann Marie with whom he has a daughter, Connor.

References

External links
 

Paralympic track and field athletes of Canada
Athletes (track and field) at the 1996 Summer Paralympics
Athletes (track and field) at the 2000 Summer Paralympics
Paralympic gold medalists for Canada
Living people
1966 births
Athletes from Toronto
Track and field athletes from Atlanta
Medalists at the 1996 Summer Paralympics
Paralympic medalists in athletics (track and field)
Canadian male wheelchair racers